WYNN (540 kHz) is an AM radio station broadcasting a gospel music format also aired on WBZF. Licensed to Florence, South Carolina, United States, it serves the Florence area. The station is currently owned by Cumulus Media.

References

External links

YNN
Gospel radio stations in the United States
Radio stations established in 1958
Cumulus Media radio stations
1958 establishments in South Carolina